Christopher Bryan Hamblin (born 14 April 1952) is a former first-class cricketer who played for Oxford University from 1971 to 1973.

Bryan Hamblin was educated at The King's School, Canterbury, before going up to Keble College, Oxford, where he studied History. A middle-order batsman and medium-pace bowler, he was a regular member of the Oxford cricket team for three years. His highest score came against Leicestershire in 1972, when he scored 37 not out and 123 not out and, opening the bowling, took 2 for 67 and 3 for 33. He was Oxford's leading batsman in 1972 with 526 runs at an average of 29.22.

He toured Bangladesh with MCC in 1978–79 and continued to play club cricket into his fifties, and was secretary of the Harlequins Cricket Club. His son James played cricket for Hampshire.

References

External links

1952 births
Living people
People educated at The King's School, Canterbury
Alumni of Keble College, Oxford
English cricketers
Oxford University cricketers
Oxford and Cambridge Universities cricketers